The Australian Hockey League  (AHL) was Australia's premier national domestic field hockey competition. Despite its non-professional nature, AHL is considered one of the strongest and most competitive national hockey leagues in the world. The AHL consists of both men's and women's competition. It includes many players from the Kookaburras and the Hockeyroos, and participating in the AHL is a selection requirement for all Australian national squad members.

The last edition of the AHL was contested in 2018. The league was replaced by Hockey One, Australia's new elite domestic hockey competition.

History
The first season of the Australian Men's National Hockey League (former AHL) took place in 1991, when the perpetual national championship was replaced by a new-look format. The competition, which was played over a two-month period, did not limit player eligibility to state of origin. Six teams competed in the first year – Brisbane Blades, Melbourne Redbacks, Adelaide Hotshots, Canberra Lakers, Sydney Stingrays and Tamworth Frogs. In 1991 and 1992, both the National Championship and the National Hockey League was played, placing a financial burden on the states. From 1993, the decision was made to play the National Hockey League as the sole competition in determining Australia's champion State.

The league has since evolved into an eight team competition played on a home and away basis before climaxing with a finals series. In 2000, 2004 and 2008 however, the league reverted to a two-week championship format. This format is designed to replicate the intense nature and heavy playing schedule of the Olympic Games. The league embraced some big changes leading into the 2001 season as the former Men's and Women's National Hockey League combined to form the Australian Hockey League (AHL). Both the men's and women's leagues shifted their seasons from mid-year to February–April and a unique format was adopted. The format devised allows a high level of hockey to be seen across Australia through four weeks of home-and-away competition. The league then climaxes with a full finals week that comprises three-round matches, the semi-finals and finals.

Competition Format and Rules

Past Editions
Prior to 2018, the Australian Hockey League was run as a centralised tournament. 

Teams were split into two pools, Pool A and Pool B, playing in a single round robin format. At the conclusion of the pool stage, the top two teams entered the medal round, while the remaining teams played in the classification round.

2018 Australian Hockey League
Like in previous editions, teams are split into Pool A and Pool B. At the conclusion of the pool stage however, teams contest in a quarterfinal format, with each team still eligible to contest the medal round.

2018 Rule Innovations
Played under FIH international rules. 4 x 15 minute quarters.
 At the end of the second and fourth quarters, one team is given a PumpPlay. During this 5-minute period, teams are reduced to 9 players, and goals for the team in possession of the PumpPlay are worth double. 

If a field goal or penalty stroke is scored, that player has an immediate one on one with the goalkeep for an extra goal. 

If any match culminates in a draw, the teams will contest a penalty shoot-out to determine a winner.

Point system

Australian Hockey League Teams

Australian Capital Territory

Both the men's and women's Australian Capital Territory representative teams entered the AHL in the inaugural year for each gender, 1991 and 1993 respectively.

The men and women have both previously represented ACT under different names. The men have represented as the ACT Lakers (2011), while the women have previously represented as the ACTAS Strikers (1995–1996) and the ACT Strikers (2011).

New South Wales

Both the men's and women's New South Wales representative teams entered the AHL in the inaugural year for each gender, 1991 and 1993 respectively.

The men and women have both previously represented NSW under different names. The men have represented as the Sydney Stingrays (1991–1992), the Sydney Scorpions (1993–1994), the NSW Warriors (1995–2000) and the NSW Panthers (2001–2004). The women have previously represented as the NSWIS Arrows (2000–2004).

Northern Territory

Both the men's and women's Northern Territory representative teams entered the AHL at different times. While the women joined in the tournament's inaugural year of 1993, the men didn't join until 1998. 

While participating for the first three years, the women's team were absent from the AHL between 1996 and 1999. 

The men and women have both previously represented NT under different names. The men have represented as the Territory Stingers (2001–2008) and the Darwin Stingers (2010, 2012), while the women have represented as the Darwin Blazez (1993–1995) and the Territory Pearls (2006–2007, 2010).

Queensland

Both the men's and women's Queensland representative teams entered the AHL in the inaugural year for each gender, 1991 and 1993 respectively.

The men and women have both previously represented QLD under different names. The men have represented as the Brisbane Blades (1991–1997), while the women have represented as the QAS Scorchers (1995–1997, 2000).

South Australia

Both the men's and women's South Australia representative teams entered the AHL in the inaugural year for each gender, 1991 and 1993 respectively.

The men and women have both previously represented SA under different names. The men have represented as the Adelaide Hotshots (1991–2007) and the Southern Hotshots (2008–2014), while the women have represented as the Adelaide Suns (1993–2007) and the Southern Suns (2008–2014).

Tasmania

Both the men's and women's Tasmania representative teams entered the AHL following the inaugural year for each gender. The men joined in 1992, while the women joined in 1996.

Victoria

Both the men's and women's Victoria representative teams entered the AHL in the inaugural year for each gender, 1991 and 1993 respectively.

The men and women have both previously represented VIC under different names. The men have represented as the Melbourne Redbacks (1991–1992, 1994–2001), the VIS Redbacks (1993) and the Azuma Vikings (2005–2006), while the women have previously represented as the VIS Vipers (1993–2004) and the Azuma Vipers (2005–2006).

Western Australia

Both the men's and women's Western Australia representative teams entered the AHL at different times. While the women joined in the tournament's inaugural year of 1993, the men didn't join until 1992. 

The men and women have both previously represented WA under different names. The men have represented as the Perth Thundersticks (1992, 1994–2001) and the WAIS Thundersticks (1993), while the women have previously represented as the WAIS Diamonds (1993–2002).

Men's AHL

Statistics

References

External links
 

 
Field hockey leagues in Australia
Professional sports leagues in Australia
1991 establishments in Australia
Sports leagues established in 1991
2018 disestablishments in Australia
Sports leagues disestablished in 2018